WZEV (90.5 FM) is a radio station licensed to serve the community of Lineville, Alabama. The station is owned by B. Jordan Communications Corporation. It airs an oldies music format. The station carries the Columbus River Dragons hockey games and coaches show along with the Choccolocco Monsters baseball team. 

The station was assigned the WZEV call letters by the Federal Communications Commission on September 3, 2012.

References

External links
 Official Website
 

ZEV
Radio stations established in 2013
2013 establishments in Alabama
Oldies radio stations in the United States
Clay County, Alabama